Saints Sergius and Bacchus Church (The Church of Martyrs Sergius and Bacchus in The Cave), also known as Abu Serga, in Coptic Cairo is one of the oldest Coptic churches in Egypt, dating back to the 4th century.

Importance
Saints Sergius and Bacchus Church is traditionally believed to have been built on the spot where the Holy Family, Joseph, Mary and the infant Jesus Christ, rested at the end of their journey into Egypt. They may have lived here while Joseph worked at the fortress.

The church is of significant historical importance, and in fact, it is where many patriarchs of the Coptic Church were elected. The first to be elected here was Patriarch Isaac (681-692)  It is the episcopal church of Cairo, and it was the episcopal See of Masr (the district of Old Cairo) that replaced the former See of Babylon. Many bishops of the See were consecrated in the Church until the reign of Patriarch Christodulus (1047–1077).

The church
The church is dedicated to Sergius and Bacchus, who were soldier-saints martyred during the 4th century in Syria by the Roman Emperor Maximian.
The most interesting feature is the crypt where Mary, Joseph and the infant Jesus are said to have rested. The crypt is 10 meters deep and, when Nile levels are high, is often flooded.

The Church was built in the 4th century and was probably finished during the 5th century. It was burned during the fire of Fustat during the reign of Marwan II around 750. It was then restored during the 8th century, and has been rebuilt and restored constantly since medieval times; however, it is still considered to be a model of the early Coptic churches. Again, the most precious and ancient of the icons are on the southern wall.

Pope Christodolos

By the 11th century AD  the Seat of the Coptic Orthodox Pope of Alexandria, which is  historically based in Alexandria, Egypt was moved to Cairo as ruling powers moved away from Alexandria to Cairo after the Arab invasion of Egypt and during Pope Christodolos's tenure Cairo became the fixed and official residence of the Coptic Pope at the Hanging Church in Cairo in 1047.

Infighting between the Church of Saints Sergius and Bacchus and the Hanging Church broke out due to that patriarch's wish to be consecrated in the latter, a ceremony that traditionally took place at Saints Sergius and Bacchus

See also
Christian Egypt
List of Coptic Orthodox churches in Egypt

References

External links
A video on the Church of St. Sergius & the visit of the Holy Family

Coptic Orthodox churches in Cairo
Old Cairo
Coptic Cairo
Coptic architecture
Church buildings with domes
4th-century churches
4th-century establishments in Egypt